The Final exam  (transit. Emtehān Nahāei) is a 2017 Iranian drama film directed by Iranian director Adel Yaraghi and co-written by Yaraghi and the late Iranian acclaimed artist Abbas Kiarostami. It was produced by Iranian producer Mostafa Shayesteh which stars Shahab Hosseini.

The film's primary plot has been written and developed by Kiarostami, although Kiarostami has never lasted to see his work on the screen. Final exam has been released only eight month after Kiarostami's sudden death.

Plot 
Farhad (Shahab Hosseini) is a mathematics teacher who goes to one of his teenage pupils' house (Saeed) in order to be his domestic tutor. Consequently, he meets Saeed's mother and falls in love with her. This encounter causes Farhad and the mother's marriage. But soon after the marriage, these two lovers find Saeed in disagreement.

Cast 

 Shahab Hosseini 
 Leila Zare
 Amir-Hossein Salamati
 Behnam Asgari
 Ramana Sayahi

Crew
Director: Adel Yaraghi
Scriptwriters: Adel Yaraghi & Abbas Kiarostami
Film editor: Adel Yaraghi
Producer: Mostafa Shayesteh
Cinematographer: Hossein Jafarian
Sound (Design & Mix): Arash Qasemi
Makeup artist: Mehrdad Qolipour
Visual effects: Ideen Aryaee-nejad
First assistant director: Bahram Sahihi

References 

 Final exam at Salam Cinema
 Final exam at Cinet web-magazine
 Final exam at Cinema ticket

Iranian drama films
Persian-language films
Abbas Kiarostami